Ano Vrontou (Gorno Brodi) is a remote mountain village and a former community in the northern Serres regional unit, Greece. Since the 2011 local government reform it is part of the municipality Serres, of which it is a municipal unit. Each year on August astrophotography hobbyists gather there due to the clear view of the night sky, a result of the villages high elevation. The municipal unit has an area of 47.306 km2. In 2011 its population was 199. Ano Vrontou is situated in the northeastern part of the Vrontous mountains, at about 1060 m elevation. It borders on the Drama regional unit to the north and east. Ano Vrontou is 6 km northwest of Kato Vrontou, 12 km east of Achladochori, 13 km northeast of Oreini, 16 km southwest of Kato Nevrokopi and 26 km northeast of Serres.

Population

History 

The finding of a Greek inscription of Roman (Imperial) times supports the conclusion that in the place of the present village there was an ancient settlement, whose residents were engaged in the exploitation of the iron mines of the mountain Vrontous.

Brodi (now Vrontou) was first mentioned in the 14th century in a letter from the Serbian tsar Stefan Dušan to Rayko, the ruler of Brodi and Trilisa (now Vathytopos). The Ottomans conquered the area and ruled until the Balkan Wars. Prior to the Second Balkan Wars, it had a Bulgarian majority and a Turkish minority.

It had around 2,700 Bulgarian inhabitants in 1873. By 1900, its population rose to 6,100 Bulgarian Christians. In 1905 according to the secretary of the exarch Dimitar Mishev the settlement had around 6,480 Bulgarian exarchists and 240 Bulgarian patriarchists, making it one of the largest places in the area.

The village had a large activity by VMORO in an Ottoman province.  In 1903, the large settlement was visited by Gotse Delchev from the Vanisha.  In 1913, it had 1,100 houses and 8,000 inhabitants. In the Balkan Wars, the area was conquered and occupied by Greece and its residents fled northward to Bulgaria, 200 of them to Nevrokop (now Gotse Delchev) and 300 fled to Plovdiv. They were replaced by Greeks that fled from Asia Minor and Eastern Thrace during the Greco-Turkish War (1919-1922).

Notable people

Dimo Hadjidimov, Internal Macedonian Revolutionary Organization (IMRO) revolutionary leader
Tasos Stambouloglou (b. 1938), Greek poet and literary critic
Georgi Sivkov (1909–1964) Leader of the Bulgarian Fatherland Front Otechstven Front

Literature
Vasil Kanshov on Ano Vrontou (Gorno Brodi)
Georgi Bazhdarov Gorno Brodi (Горно Броди or Ano Vrontou), Sofia, 1929
Vidoeski, Bozhidar Gorno Vrodi, Drama, Skopje, 1992 XVII 2, p 5-89

See also

List of settlements in the Serres regional unit

References

External links
Aerial Photographs of Ano Vrontou at airphotos.gr
Ano Vrontou at the GTP Travel Pages

Populated places in Serres (regional unit)
Geography of ancient Macedonia